Inape cinnamobrunnea is a species of moth of the family Tortricidae. It is found in Ecuador (Morona-Santiago Province, Tungurahua Province and Napo Province) and Peru.

References

External links

Moths described in 2006
Endemic fauna of Ecuador
Moths of South America
cinnamobrunnea
Taxa named by Józef Razowski